Irina Yuryevna Yanina (27 November 1966 – 31 August 1999) was a Russian nurse, medical sergeant and Hero of the Russian Federation.

Biography 
Irina Yanina was born in the town of Taldy-Kurgan, Kazakh Soviet Socialist Republic. After graduating from a medical school, Irina Yanina worked as a nurse’s assistant and a nurse in a tuberculosis dispensary and in a maternity hospital.

Military service
In 1995 she enlisted in the Russian Internal Troops of the Ministry of Internal Affairs (Russia). She served as a nurse in a medical company of the 22nd Operational Brigade in the town of Kalach-na-Donu. During the First Chechen War Irina made two tours of duty to the area of conflict. During the Second Chechen War her unit deployed to Dagestan in July 1999.

Death
On 31 August 1999, Sgt Yanina was with an evacuation group which rendered assistance to wounded soldiers during the battle for Karamakhi village. At the risk of her life she gave medical help to 15 wounded soldiers. Moreover, she rode into the battle in APC under heavy enemy fire for three times and managed to save twenty-eight soldiers of federal forces.

When she was trying to access the wounded for the fourth time, the enemy changed over to offensive tactics. Irina Yanina organized the shipping of wounded and covered the operation with fire from an assault rifle. While their APC was moving away from the area it was hit by rocket-propelled grenades and set on fire. Sgt Yanina had successfully helped the wounded to get out of the burning vehicle, but couldn’t manage to leave it herself and died in the fire. For her bravery, Sgt Yanina was permanently added into her unit’s muster roll.

References

Bibliography
 

1966 births
1999 deaths
Military nurses
Russian military personnel killed in action
Women in the Chechen wars
People from Taldykorgan
Heroes of the Russian Federation